Route 75 may refer to:

London Buses route 75
Melbourne tram route 75, Vermont South to Spencer Street, Melbourne.
SEPTA Route 75, Philadelphia

See also
List of highways numbered 75

75